José David Suárez (born 26 June 1953) is a Cuban volleyball player. He competed in the men's tournament at the 1980 Summer Olympics.

References

1953 births
Living people
Cuban men's volleyball players
Olympic volleyball players of Cuba
Volleyball players at the 1980 Summer Olympics
Place of birth missing (living people)